The Logue Brook Dam is a dam located in the south-west of Western Australia in the Darling Scarp near the town of Yarloop.  The impoundment, a reservoir, is known as Lake Brockman.

It was opened by the Minister for Works and Water Supplies, G.P. Wild on 8 November 1963.

Recreation
The dam was built to supply water for the South-West Irrigation Scheme and therefore recreational use has been permitted.

In November 2007 the Premier Alan Carpenter closed the dam for such use to enable the water to become part of the state's Integrated Water Supply by 2010.  Lake Kepwari near Collie was developed as an alternative nearby water recreation facility. The decision was reversed by Premier Colin Barnett in December 2008 and the dam has since reverted to recreational use allowed.  The dam is no longer considered as a potential source of drinking water.

Camping facilities are available at the damsite.  Recreational water skiing and fishing is also currently permitted.

Logue Brook Dam has been used for many years by recreational scuba divers. Many divers used the still waters of the dam as a training ground for deep dives.

References

Dams completed in 1963
Dams in Western Australia
Shire of Harvey